Live On may refer to:

 Live On (The Seekers album), 1989
 Live On (Kenny Wayne Shepherd album), 1999
 Live On (TV series), 2020